Raymon "Ray" Gaddis (born January 13, 1990) is an American professional soccer player who plays as a defender for FC Cincinnati in Major League Soccer.

College career
Gaddis grew up in Indianapolis, Indiana, attended North Central High School, and played college soccer at West Virginia from 2009–2011. Gaddis received second team all-Big East honors in his junior and senior seasons respectively. Gaddis was also one of two players to play every minute during the 2010 campaign. Gaddis ended his college career with 6 assists in 73 career games. Gaddis also played for Philadelphia Union PDL affiliate Reading United in 2010 and 2011. During his tenure at Reading, he scored a goal and registered 8 assists.

Club career
Gaddis was drafted in the second round (35th overall) of the 2012 MLS SuperDraft by Philadelphia Union. Gaddis made his MLS Debut on April 14 against the Columbus Crew SC when Danny Califf was a late scratch.  On June 23, he recorded his first MLS assist in the Union’s 4–0 win over Sporting Kansas City. Gaddis's rookie season finished with 18 appearances, including 17 starts, earning him recognition in the Soccer By Ives 2012 MLS All-Rookie Best XI. His rookie season was further recognized by earning the 2012 NAACP Image Award for Male Athlete of the Year.

During the 2014 season, the Union signed Gaddis to a contract extension through the 2016 season on September 10. Through the 2014 season, Gaddis became a mainstay of the Union's defense, often deployed as a left-back (as opposed to his natural right-sided position). He would finish the season with 34 starts and contributed to the Union's first U.S. Open Cup final. Gaddis was also recognized in 2014 with the team specific FIFA 15 MLS covers where it was reveal Gaddis was chosen as the cover man to represent the Union.

In August 2018, Gaddis became the Union's all time leader in minutes played after a home win against New England Revolution. Gaddis re-signed with the Union in January 2019, keeping in Philadelphia for an eighth season.

On March 4, 2021, Gaddis announced his retirement from professional soccer, after appearing in 227 matches for Philadelphia. On January 5, 2022, he came out of retirement to sign for FC Cincinnati on a contract that runs through 2023 with an option for the 2024 season. The move reunited him with both Cincinnati head coach and former Union assistant Pat Noonan and general manager Chris Albright, his former Union teammate and later the club's technical director.

Personal life
Gaddis is a Christian. Gaddis is active in giving back to the community. On January 7, 2013, Gaddis represented the Philadelphia Union in Newtown, Connecticut for the "Soccer for Newtown" event. In March 2013, Gaddis and fellow Union members participated in the annual White House Easter Egg Roll.

In 2020, Gaddis took up an instrumental role in the creation of Black Players for Change, an organization of MLS players and coaches intended to help spur political action with peaceful protests and to amplify black voices and black communities.

Career statistics

Club

Notes

Honors

Club
Philadelphia Union
 Supporters' Shield: 2020
 Jerry Yeagley Award: 2020

References

External links
 
 
 West Virginia Profile

1990 births
Living people
African-American soccer players
American soccer players
Association football defenders
Major League Soccer players
Philadelphia Union players
FC Cincinnati players
Soccer players from Indianapolis
West Virginia Mountaineers men's soccer players
Reading United A.C. players
USL League Two players
21st-century African-American sportspeople